Shahidabad (also Romanized as Shahīdābād; also known as Cham Bayān and Cham-e Bayān) is a village in Shahidabad Rural District, Mashhad-e Morghab District, Khorrambid County, Fars Province, Iran. At the 2006 census, its population was 687, in 182 families.

References 

Populated places in Khorrambid County